Dorona Alberti (born 1975, Maastricht) is a singer and actress whose projects include: industrial music act KMFDM, Hobson, Fairocious, Old Shoes, Pick up the Pieces, Briskey, and most recently, the Dutch/Belgian Lounge group Gare du Nord.

History
Alberti studied theater at the University of Amsterdam and jazz at Rotterdam Conservatory. She began working with KMFDM in 1992, and performed on most of the albums in the 1990s.  In 1999, she had a role in a short Dutch-language Flemish film called To Speak, which is available on a compilation DVD titled 10 jaar Leuven Kort.

Alberti currently resides in Rotterdam.

Discography
KMFDM
Money (1992)
Angst (1993)
Nihil (1995)
Xtort (1996)
Boots (2002)
Attak (2002)

Gare du Nord
Sex 'n' Jazz (2007)
Love For Lunch (2009)
Lilywhite Soul (2011)
Lifesexy (2012)
Stronger! (2015)

Filmography
10 jaar leuven kort (2004)
To speak (1999)

References

External links 

https://web.archive.org/web/20050911143313/http://www.briskey.be/liveband.html
MySpace page

1975 births
Living people
Dutch actresses
Codarts University for the Arts alumni
University of Amsterdam alumni
Actors from Maastricht
Musicians from Maastricht
21st-century Dutch singers
21st-century Dutch women singers